Aneflus is a genus of beetles in the family Cerambycidae, containing the following species:

 Aneflus basicornis Linsley, 1936
 Aneflus bullocki Chemsak & Giesbert, 1986
 Aneflus calvatus Horn in Leng, 1885
 Aneflus cylindricollis Bates, 1892
 Aneflus glabropunctatus Chemsak & Linsley, 1963
 Aneflus humeralis Chemsak & Linsley, 1963
 Aneflus levettei (Casey, 1891)
 Aneflus longissimus (Bates, 1885)
 Aneflus maryannae Chemsak & Linsley, 1968
 Aneflus minutivestis Chemsak & Linsley, 1963
 Aneflus nivarius Chemsak & Linsley, 1963
 Aneflus obscurus (LeConte, 1873)
 Aneflus paracalvatus Knull, 1955
 Aneflus pilosicornis Chemsak & Linsley, 1965
 Aneflus planus Franz, 1954
 Aneflus poriferus Giesbert, 1993
 Aneflus prolixus LeConte, 1873
 Aneflus protensus (LeConte, 1858)
 Aneflus pubescens (Linsley, 1934)
 Aneflus rugicollis Linsley, 1935
 Aneflus sericatus Chemsak & Linsley, 1968
 Aneflus sonoranus Casey, 1924
 Aneflus variegatus Chemsak & Linsley, 1963
 Aneflus zilchi Franz, 1954

References

 
Elaphidiini